These are the Balto-Slavic languages categorized by sub-groups, including number of speakers.

Baltic languages 

 Latvian, 1.75 million speakers (2015)
 Latgalian, 200 000 speakers (2009)
 Lithuanian, 3 million speakers (2012)

West Slavic languages 

 Polish, 55 million speakers (2010)
 Kashubian
 Czech, 10.6 million speakers (2012)
 Slovak, 5.2 million speakers (2011–12)
 Sorbian, ca. 50,000 speakers

South Slavic languages 

 Serbo-Croatian, 21 million speakers, including second language speakers
 Bosnian, Croatian, Serbian and Montenegrin standards with dialectal differences
 Bulgarian, 9 million (2005–12)
 Slovene, 2.5 million speakers (2010)
 Macedonian, 1.4–3.5 million speakers (1986–2011)
 Church Slavonic (liturgical)

East Slavic languages 

 Russian, 150 million speakers (2010), 260 million including L2 (2012)
 Ukrainian, 45 million speakers (2007)
 Belarusian, 3.2 million speakers (2009)
 Rusyn

Extinct languages 
 Proto-Balto-Slavic language

Slavic
 Proto-Slavic
 Old Church Slavonic, liturgical
 Knaanic, Jewish language
 Old Novgorod
 Old East Slavic, developed into modern East Slavic languages
 Old Ruthenian
 Polabian language
 Pomeranian language, only Kashubian remains as a living dialect
 South Slavic dialects used in medieval Greece

Baltic
 Curonian
 Old Prussian
 Galindan
 Selonian
 Semigallian
 Sudovian

See also
 Outline of Slavic history and culture
 List of Slavic studies journals

Notes

External links